Dhyana may refer to:

Meditative practices in Indian religions
 Dhyana in Buddhism (Pāli: jhāna)
 Dhyana in Hinduism
 Jain Dhyāna, see Jain meditation

Other
Dhyana, a work by British composer John Tavener (1944-2013)
Dhyana (MaYaN album), 2018
Hygon Dhyana, a x86 compatible microprocessor